Rhynchostegium is a genus of pleurocarpous mosses belonging to the family Brachytheciaceae. The genus has a cosmopolitan distribution across different climatological regions except the polar regions, mostly in tropic to north temperate regions. The genus contains both aquatic and terrestrial species. The genus was named for their rostrate opercula. The type species of this genus is Rhynchostegium confertum (Dicks.) Schimp.

Etymology 
The genus name comes from the Greek rhyncho- (beaked) and stegos (a lid), which refers to the rostrate operculum of the sporophyte.

History 
The genus was first described by Bruch and Wilhelm Philippe Schimper in 1852.

Habitats 
Terrestrial species of Rhynchostegium live in moist to wet or shaded habitats, on rock, soil, tree base, tree stem, and logs.

Aquatic species live by or in running water, including streams, springs, rivers, beds of waterfalls, and seepy cliffs.

Morphology

Gametophyte 

Rhynchostegium are small to large mosses that form either loose tuft or extensive mats on the substrate, with irregular or regular branching. The younger plants are generally deep green or light green; aging plants could become whitish, brownish, or paler green. Stems are creeping and lack hyaloderm, with acute to acuminate pseudoparaphyllia. Stem leaves are erectopatent or erect. Branch leaves are similar in morphology to stem leaves but smaller and sometimes narrower. Leaves are commonly straightly to homomallously arranged; subimbricate, subcomplanate, or complanate arrangement are sometimes seen, especially in branch leaves. Leaf base, decurrent or not, varies from ovate to ovate-cordate, occasionally lanceolate, and the narrowing from gradual to abrupt, towards a short- or long-acuminate apex, where sometimes a differentiated long acumen or apiculus is present. The leaves have a single costa that generally smoothly ends 35-75% up the leaf, and more often in branch leaves in an abaxial spine. Leaf surfaces vary from flat to slightly concave and not to strongly longitudinally plicate, with little to some pores and linear laminal cells. Leaf margins are serrate to serrulate. Axillary hairs constitute of 3-7 cells, with 1-3 upper cells.  Alar cells are slightly enlarged, and either undifferentiated or quadrate to elongate-rectangular.

Sporophyte 
Rhynchostegium are autoicous. Covered by a naked calyptra is a rostrate to long-rostrate operculum attached to a red-brown to brown, oblong-cylindric, weakly curved capsule, which is inclined or horizontal to a red-brown, smooth seta that has abruptly contracted perichaetial leaves at the base, with acumen straight to reflexed.  An annulus separates the operculum. The peristome is xerochastic and perfect, which the red to orange-red exostomes have reduced trabeculae and cross-striolae at the base of the teeth; in rare cases the exostomes are narrow and yellow. The broadly or narrowly perforated endostomes and developed to vestigial cilia are supported by a low or high basal membrane. Spore diameters range between 9-16 µm.

Biochemistry

Allelopathy 

Allelopathy has been studied on Rhynchostegium pallidifolium, which usually form pure colonies in their natural habitat. Methanol extract of R.pallidifolium represses the seedling of cress, alfalfa, lettuce, ryegrass, timothy,and Digitaria sanguinalis in a concentration-dependent manner. A combination of ESI-MS and 1H NMR analyses identified the inhibitory chemical as 3-hydroxy-β-ionone. Further study showed a minimal 3-hydroxy-β-ionone concentration of 1 µM for the inhibition of cress hypocotyl growth, and 3 µM for cress root growth, while the endogenous concentration. The presence of 3-hydroxy-β-ionone in their natural substrate and the growing medium suggested secretion to the environment, which may imply an important role of 3-hydroxy-β-ionone in competition with other plants and the forming of pure colonies.

Antibacterial 

Acetone extract of Rhynchostegium riparioides showed antibiotic activity on some Gram-negative bacteria, including Escherichia coli, Proteus mirabilis, Entero-bacter cloacae and Pseudomonas aeruginosa.

Ethanolic extract of Rhynchostegium vagans showed similar effect on some Gram-negative bacteria and fungi, with performance superior to chloramphenicol and fluconazole.

Applications

Freshwater monitoring 
Rhynchostegium riparioides is used in monitoring of heavy metals concentration in freshwater in multiple regions around the world, such as copper, zinc. R. riparioides as a neutrophilous species has been used in monitoring water acidification.

List of species 
The World Flora Online lists 221 species of Rhynchostegium.
 
 Rhynchostegium acanthophyllum (Mont.) A. Jaeger
 Rhynchostegium acicula (Broth.) Broth.
 Rhynchostegium acutifolium (Hook. f. & Wilson) A. Jaeger
 Rhynchostegium alboviridum R.S. Williams
 Rhynchostegium algirianum (Brid. ex P. Beauv.) Lindb.
 Rhynchostegium alopecuroides (Brid.) A.J.E. Sm.
 Rhynchostegium altisetum Müll. Hal.
 Rhynchostegium ambiguum (Schwägr.) W.R. Buck
 Rhynchostegium anceps (Bosch & Sande Lac.) A. Jaeger
 Rhynchostegium aneuron Kindb.
 Rhynchostegium angustifolium Renauld & Cardot
 Rhynchostegium apophysatum (Hornsch.) A. Jaeger
 Rhynchostegium aquaticum A. Jaeger
 Rhynchostegium arcticum (I. Hagen) Ignatov & Huttunen
 Rhynchostegium asperisetum (Müll. Hal.) A. Jaeger
 Rhynchostegium assumptionis Besch.
 Rhynchostegium bello-intricatum (Broth.) Paris
 Rhynchostegium bequaertii Thér. & Naveau
 Rhynchostegium berteroanum (Mont.) A. Jaeger
 Rhynchostegium beskeanum (Müll. Hal.) A. Jaeger
 Rhynchostegium bifariellum (Kindb.) Kindb.
 Rhynchostegium brachypterum (Hornsch.) A. Jaeger
 Rhynchostegium brachypyxis Renauld & Cardot
 Rhynchostegium brachythecioides Dixon & P. de la Varde
 Rhynchostegium brandegei (Austin) Renauld & Cardot
 Rhynchostegium brevicuspis Müll. Hal.
 Rhynchostegium brevinerve Huttunen & Ignatov
 Rhynchostegium brevirete Broth.
 Rhynchostegium buluense (Broth.) Paris
 Rhynchostegium cacticola (Müll. Hal.) Paris
 Rhynchostegium calderi Vohra
 Rhynchostegium caloosiense (Austin) Renauld & Cardot
 Rhynchostegium campylocarpum (Müll. Hal.) De Not.
 Rhynchostegium campylocladulum Müll. Hal.
 Rhynchostegium cataractarum Thér. & P. de la Varde
 Rhynchostegium celebicum (Sande Lac.) A. Jaeger
 Rhynchostegium chrysophylloides A. Jaeger
 Rhynchostegium circinatum (Brid.) De Not.
 Rhynchostegium cirrosum (Schwägr.) De Not.
 Rhynchostegium collatum (Hook. & Wilson) Broth. & Watts
 Rhynchostegium comorae (Müll. Hal.) A. Jaeger
 Rhynchostegium complanum (Mitt.) A. Jaeger
 Rhynchostegium compridense (Müll. Hal. ex Broth.) Paris
 Rhynchostegium conchophyllum (Taylor) A. Jaeger
 Rhynchostegium confertum (Dicks.) Schimp.
 Rhynchostegium confusum Cezón, J. Muñoz, Hedenäs & Huttunen
 Rhynchostegium congruens (Hampe) Mitt.
 Rhynchostegium conostomus (Mont.) Huttunen & Ignatov
 Rhynchostegium contortulum Tixier
 Rhynchostegium contractum Cardot
 Rhynchostegium crassinervium (Taylor) De Not.
 Rhynchostegium cylindritheca Dixon
 Rhynchostegium dasyphyllum Müll. Hal.
 Rhynchostegium delicatulum James
 Rhynchostegium demissum (Wilson) Schimp.
 Rhynchostegium dentiferum (Hampe) A. Jaeger
 Rhynchostegium deplanatum (Bruch & Schimp. ex Sull.) Kindb.
 Rhynchostegium depressum (Brid.) Schimp.
 Rhynchostegium distans Besch.
 Rhynchostegium distratum (Hampe) A. Jaeger
 Rhynchostegium drepanocladioides (Müll. Hal.) Kindb.
 Rhynchostegium duthiei Müll. Hal. ex Dixon
 Rhynchostegium elusum (Mitt.) A. Jaeger
 Rhynchostegium erythropodium (Hampe) Mitt.
 Rhynchostegium esquirolii Cardot & Thér.
 Rhynchostegium exiguum (Blandow) Brockm.
 Rhynchostegium exilissimum (Sull.) A. Jaeger
 Rhynchostegium fabroniadelphus (Müll. Hal.) A. Jaeger
 Rhynchostegium fauriei Cardot
 Rhynchostegium finitimum (Hampe) Ångström
 Rhynchostegium fissidens (Müll. Hal.) Kindb.
 Rhynchostegium fissidentellum Besch.
 Rhynchostegium fragilicuspis Dixon
 Rhynchostegium fuegianum (Cardot) Huttunen & Ignatov
 Rhynchostegium funckii (Schimp.) De Not.
 Rhynchostegium gaudichaudii (Mont.) A. Jaeger
 Rhynchostegium georgianum Dixon & Grout
 Rhynchostegium glaucovirescens (Müll. Hal.) Kindb.
 Rhynchostegium globipyxis (Müll. Hal.) Kindb.
 Rhynchostegium gracilipes Thér.
 Rhynchostegium graminicolor (Brid.) A.L. Andrews
 Rhynchostegium herbaceum (Mitt.) A. Jaeger
 Rhynchostegium hians (Hedw.) Delogne
 Rhynchostegium homaliocaulon (Müll. Hal.) Kindb.
 Rhynchostegium hookeri A. Jaeger
 Rhynchostegium hopfferi (Welw. & Duby) A. Gepp
 Rhynchostegium horridum Broth.
 Rhynchostegium huitomalconum (Müll. Hal.) Besch.
 Rhynchostegium humillimum (Mitt.) A. Jaeger
 Rhynchostegium hunanense Ignatov & Huttunen
 Rhynchostegium huttonii (Hampe ex Beckett) Paris
 Rhynchostegium illecebrum (Schimp.) Delogne
 Rhynchostegium inaequale Dixon
 Rhynchostegium inclinatum (Mitt.) A. Jaeger
 Rhynchostegium inerme (Mitt.) A. Jaeger
 Rhynchostegium irriguum Dixon
 Rhynchostegium isopterygioides Cardot
 Rhynchostegium jamesii Sull.
 Rhynchostegium javanicum (Bél.) Besch.
 Rhynchostegium jovet-astiae Bizot
 Rhynchostegium laevisetum (Geh.) Mitt.
 Rhynchostegium lamasicum (Spruce ex Mitt.) Besch.
 Rhynchostegium laxatum (Mitt.) Paris
 Rhynchostegium laxirete Broth.
 Rhynchostegium leptoblastum (Müll. Hal.) Kindb.
 Rhynchostegium leptomerocarpum (Müll. Hal.) Besch.
 Rhynchostegium leptopteridium Müll. Hal.
 Rhynchostegium leucodictyon Müll. Hal.
 Rhynchostegium lindmanii (Broth.) Paris
 Rhynchostegium lusitanicum (Kindb.) Broth.
 Rhynchostegium luteonitens (Welw. & Duby) A. Jaeger
 Rhynchostegium mac-owanianum Paris
 Rhynchostegium malmei (Broth.) Paris
 Rhynchostegium megapolitanum (Blandow ex F. Weber & D. Mohr) Schimp.
 Rhynchostegium membranaceum (Müll. Hal.) Broth.
 Rhynchostegium menadense (Sande Lac.) A. Jaeger
 Rhynchostegium meridionale (Schimp.) De Not.
 Rhynchostegium micans (Sw.) Austin
 Rhynchostegium microthamnioides Müll. Hal.
 Rhynchostegium minutum Müll. Hal.
 Rhynchostegium muelleri A. Jaeger
 Rhynchostegium murale (Hedw.) Schimp.
 Rhynchostegium muriculatum (Hook. f. & Wilson) Reichardt
 Rhynchostegium mutatum (Ochyra & Vanderp.) Huttunen & Ignatov
 Rhynchostegium myosuroides (Brid.) De Not.
 Rhynchostegium nanopennatum (Broth.) Kindb.
 Rhynchostegium nanothecium Müll. Hal. ex Dixon
 Rhynchostegium nervosum (Kiaer ex Renauld) Broth. ex Cardot
 Rhynchostegium nigrescens Besch.
 Rhynchostegium oblongifolium Broth. & Watts
 Rhynchostegium obtusatum Broth.
 Rhynchostegium obtusifolium (Mitt.) A. Jaeger
 Rhynchostegium occultum Larraín, Huttunen, Ignatova & Ignatov
 Rhynchostegium omocrates W.R. Buck
 Rhynchostegium ovalfolium S. Okamura
 Rhynchostegium oxyodon (Welw. & Duby) A. Gepp
 Rhynchostegium pallidifolium (Mitt.) A. Jaeger
 Rhynchostegium pallidius (Hampe) A. Jaeger
 Rhynchostegium pampae (Müll. Hal.) Kindb.
 Rhynchostegium parvulum Broth.
 Rhynchostegium patulifolium Cardot & Thér.
 Rhynchostegium patulum A. Jaeger
 Rhynchostegium pectinatum (Mitt.) Paris
 Rhynchostegium pellucidum Dixon
 Rhynchostegium pendulum (Brid.) A. Jaeger
 Rhynchostegium peruviense (R.S. Williams) Ochyra
 Rhynchostegium pervilleanum (Schimp.) A. Jaeger
 Rhynchostegium philippinense (Duby) A. Jaeger
 Rhynchostegium piliferum (Hedw.) De Not.
 Rhynchostegium pinnicaule (Müll. Hal.) Kindb.
 Rhynchostegium plagiotheciella Müll. Hal.
 Rhynchostegium planifolium Müll. Hal.
 Rhynchostegium planiusculum (Mitt.) A. Jaeger
 Rhynchostegium praecox (Hedw.) De Not.
 Rhynchostegium praelongum (Hedw.) De Not.
 Rhynchostegium pringlei Cardot
 Rhynchostegium pseudoconfertum (Müll. Hal.) A. Jaeger
 Rhynchostegium pseudodistans Cardot
 Rhynchostegium pseudomurale (Hampe) A. Jaeger
 Rhynchostegium pseudoserrulatum (Kindb.) Kindb.
 Rhynchostegium psilopodium Ignatov & Huttunen
 Rhynchostegium pulchellum (Hedw.) H. Rob.
 Rhynchostegium pumilum (Wilson) De Not.
 Rhynchostegium raphidorrhynchum (Müll. Hal.) A. Jaeger
 Rhynchostegium recurvans (Michx.) Besch.
 Rhynchostegium revelstokense (Kindb.) Kindb.
 Rhynchostegium riparioides (Hedw.) Cardot
 Rhynchostegium rivale (Hampe) A. Jaeger
 Rhynchostegium robustum W.R. Buck
 Rhynchostegium rotundifolium (Scop. ex Brid.) Schimp.
 Rhynchostegium royae (Austin) Renauld & Cardot
 Rhynchostegium ruvenzorense (Broth.) Paris
 Rhynchostegium santaiense (Broth. & Paris) Broth.
 Rhynchostegium sarcoblastum Broth. & Paris
 Rhynchostegium savatieri Paris
 Rhynchostegium scariosum (Taylor) A. Jaeger
 Rhynchostegium selaginellifolium Müll. Hal.
 Rhynchostegium sellowii (Hornsch.) A. Jaeger
 Rhynchostegium semiscabrum (E.B. Bartram) H. Rob.
 Rhynchostegium semitortulum Kindb.
 Rhynchostegium semitortum A. Jaeger
 Rhynchostegium senodictyon (Müll. Hal.) A. Jaeger
 Rhynchostegium serpenticaule (Müll. Hal.) Broth.
 Rhynchostegium serrulatum (Hedw.) A. Jaeger
 Rhynchostegium shawii Hutsemekers & Vanderp.
 Rhynchostegium sinense (Broth. & Paris) Broth.
 Rhynchostegium sparsirameum (Geh. & Hampe) Paris
 Rhynchostegium stokesii (Turner) De Not.
 Rhynchostegium stramineoides (Sauerb.) Wijk & Margad.
 Rhynchostegium striatum (Schreb. ex Hedw.) De Not.
 Rhynchostegium strigosum (Hoffm. ex F. Weber & D. Mohr) De Not.
 Rhynchostegium strongylense (Bott.) W.R. Buck & Privitera
 Rhynchostegium styriacum (Limpr.) Kindb.
 Rhynchostegium subacutifolium (Müll. Hal. ex Geh.) A. Jaeger
 Rhynchostegium subbrachypterum Broth. & Bryhn
 Rhynchostegium subclavatum (Hampe) A. Jaeger
 Rhynchostegium subconfertum (Müll. Hal.) A. Jaeger
 Rhynchostegium subenerve A. Jaeger
 Rhynchostegium submenadense Thér. & P. de la Varde
 Rhynchostegium subperspicuum (Müll. Hal.) Broth.
 Rhynchostegium subrectocarpum (Dixon) Vohra
 Rhynchostegium subrotundum (Hampe) A. Jaeger
 Rhynchostegium subrusciforme (Müll. Hal.) A. Jaeger
 Rhynchostegium subserrulatum (Müll. Hal.) A. Jaeger
 Rhynchostegium subspeciosum (Müll. Hal.) Müll. Hal.
 Rhynchostegium subtrachypterum Bryhn ex P. Syd.
 Rhynchostegium surrectum (Mitt.) A. Jaeger
 Rhynchostegium taphrophilum Müll. Hal.
 Rhynchostegium tenellum (Dicks.) Schimp.
 Rhynchostegium tenuifolium (Hedw.) Reichardt
 Rhynchostegium tenuivagum (Broth.) Paris
 Rhynchostegium tocaremae (Hampe) A. Jaeger
 Rhynchostegium trachynotum (Müll. Hal.) Kindb.
 Rhynchostegium trachypelma (Müll. Hal.) A. Jaeger
 Rhynchostegium trieblingii Müll. Hal.
 Rhynchostegium tubaronense Müll. Hal.
 Rhynchostegium ulicon (Taylor) A. Jaeger
 Rhynchostegium validum (Herzog) Ochyra
 Rhynchostegium vitianum E.B. Bartram & Dixon
 Rhynchostegium volkensii (Broth.) Paris
 Rhynchostegium vriesei (Dozy & Molk.) A. Jaeger
 Rhynchostegium zeyheri (Spreng. ex Müll. Hal.) A. Jaeger

References

Hypnales
Moss genera